504 may refer to:
504, a year
Avro 504, a World War 1 era biplane aircraft built by A. V. Roe and Company,
Peugeot 504, a car
Area code 504
Section 504 of the Rehabilitation Act, which protects Americans with disabilities from discrimination by any entity that receives Federal funding.
HTTP status code 504
504 King, a streetcar route operated by the Toronto Transit Commission
No. 504 (County of Nottingham) Squadron, RAuxAF